Yoga as therapy is the use of yoga as exercise, consisting mainly of postures called asanas, as a gentle form of exercise and relaxation applied specifically with the intention of improving health. This form of yoga is widely practised in classes, and may involve meditation, imagery, breath work (pranayama) and calming music as well as postural yoga.

At least three types of health claim have been made for yoga: magical claims for medieval haṭha yoga, including the power of healing; unsupported claims of benefits to organ systems from the practice of asanas; and more or less well supported claims of specific medical and psychological benefits from studies of differing sizes using a wide variety of methodologies.

Systematic reviews have found beneficial effects of yoga on low back pain and depression, but despite much investigation little or no evidence for benefit for specific medical conditions. Study of trauma-sensitive yoga has been hampered by weak methodology.

Context 

Yoga classes used as therapy usually consist of asanas (postures used for stretching), pranayama (breathing exercises), and relaxation in savasana (lying down). The physical asanas of modern yoga are related to medieval haṭha yoga tradition, but they were not widely practiced in India before the early 20th century.

The number of schools and styles of yoga in the Western world has grown rapidly from the late 20th century. By 2012, there were at least 19 widespread styles from Ashtanga Vinyasa Yoga to Viniyoga. These emphasise different aspects including aerobic exercise, precision in the asanas, and spirituality in the haṭha yoga tradition. These aspects can be illustrated by schools with distinctive styles. Iyengar Yoga emphasises correct alignment in the postures, working slowly, if necessary with props, and ending with relaxation. Sivananda Yoga focuses more on spiritual practice, with 12 basic poses, chanting in Sanskrit, pranayama breathing exercises, meditation, and relaxation in each class, and importance is placed on vegetarian diet.

Types of claim

At least three different types of claim of therapeutic benefit have been made for yoga from medieval times onwards, not counting the more general claims of good health made throughout this period: magical powers, biomedical claims for marketing purposes, and specific medical claims. Neither of the first two are supported by reliable evidence. The medical claims are supported by evidence of varying quality, from case studies to controlled trials and ultimately systematic review of multiple trials.

Magical powers

Medieval authors asserted that Haṭha yoga brought physical (as well as spiritual) benefits, and provided magical powers including of healing. The Hatha Yoga Pradipika (HYP) states that asanas in general, described as the first auxiliary of haṭha yoga, give "steadiness, good health, and lightness of limb." (HYP 1.17)  Specific asanas, it claims, bring additional benefits; for example, Matsyendrasana awakens Kundalini and helps to prevent semen from being shed involuntarily; (HYP 1.27) Paschimottanasana "stokes up the digestive fire, slims the belly and gives good health"; (HYP 1.29) Shavasana "takes away fatigue and relaxes the mind"; (HYP 1.32) while Padmasana "destroys all diseases" (HYP 1.47). These claims lie within a tradition across all forms of yoga that practitioners can gain supernatural powers. Hemachandra's Yogashastra (1.8–9) lists the magical powers, which include healing and the destruction of poisons.

Biomedical claims for marketing purposes

Twentieth century advocates of some schools of yoga, such as B. K. S. Iyengar, have for various reasons made claims for the effects of yoga on specific organs, without adducing any evidence.
The yoga scholar Suzanne Newcombe argues that this was one of several visions of yoga as in some sense therapeutic, ranging from medical to a more popular offer of health and well-being.
The yoga scholar Andrea Jain describes these claims of Iyengar's in terms of "elaborating and fortifying his yoga brand" and "mass-marketing", calling Iyengar's 1966 book Light on Yoga "arguably the most significant event in the process of elaborating the brand". The yoga teacher Bernie Gourley notes that the book neither describes contraindications systematically, nor provides evidence for the claimed benefits. Jain suggests that "Its biomedical dialect was attractive to many." For example, in the book, Iyengar claims that the asanas of the Eka Pada Sirsasana cycle

The history of such claims was reviewed by William J. Broad in his 2012 book The Science of Yoga. Broad argues that while the health claims for yoga began as Hindu nationalist posturing, it turns out that there is ironically "a wealth of real benefits".

Evidence-based medical claims

Researchers have studied the medical and psychological effects of yoga as exercise in a wide range of trials and observational studies, sometimes with careful controls, providing evidence of differing quality about yoga's possible benefits. The physician and yoga therapist Timothy McCall has assembled an extensive list of studies, grouped by condition, providing evidence of varying quality for "117 Health Conditions Helped by Yoga"; he notes the "irony" that "in yoga therapy, we don't treat medical conditions per se. We treat individuals." The various types of claim, and the evidence for them, are discussed below.

Types of activity

Remedial yoga

The International Association of Yoga Therapists offers a definition of yoga therapy that can encompass a wide range of activities and practices, calling it "the process of empowering individuals to progress toward improved health and well-being through the application of the teachings and practices of Yoga".

The history of remedial yoga goes back to the pioneers of modern yoga, Krishnamacharya and Iyengar. Iyengar was sickly as a child, and yoga with his brother-in-law Krishnamacharya improved his health; it had also helped his daughter Geeta, so his response to his students' health issues, in Newcombe's view, "was an intense and personal one." In effect Iyengar was treating "remedial yoga" as analogous to Henrik Ling's medical gymnastics. As early as 1940, Iyengar was using yoga as a therapy for common conditions such as sinus problems, backache, and fatigue. Iyengar was willing to push people through pain "to [show] them new possibilities." In the 1960s, he trained a few people such as Diana Clifton and Silva Mehta to deliver this remedial yoga; particular asanas were used for different conditions, and non-remedial Iyengar Yoga teachers were taught to tell students that ordinary classes were not suitable for "serious health issues". Mehta taught a remedial yoga class in the Iyengar Yoga Institute in Maida Vale from its opening in 1984; she contributed "Remedial Programs" for conditions such as arthritis, backache, knee cartilage problems, pregnancy, sciatica, scoliosis and varicose veins in the Mehtas' 1990 book Yoga the Iyengar Way. However, Iyengar was deferential to Western medicine and its assessments, so in Newcombe's view Iyengar Yoga is "positioned as complementary to standard medical treatment rather than as an alternative".

Newcombe argues that in Britain, yoga "largely avoided overt conflict with the medical profession by simultaneously professionalising with educational qualifications and deferring to medical expertise." After Richard Hittleman's Yoga for Health series on ITV from 1971 to 1974, the series producer Howard Kent founded a charity, the Yoga for Health Foundation, to "Research into the therapeutic benefits to be obtained by the practice of yoga"; residential courses began in 1978 at Ickwell Bury in Bedfordshire. The Foundation stated that yoga was not a therapy or cure but had "therapeutic benefits", whether physical, mental, or emotional, and it worked especially with "the physically handicapped". Newcombe notes that a third organisation, the Yoga Biomedical Trust, was founded in Cambridge in 1983 by a biologist, Robin Monro, to research complementary therapies. He found it hard to obtain research funding, and in the 1990s moved to London, focusing on training yoga teachers in yoga as therapy and providing yoga as individualised therapy, using pranayama, relaxation and asanas.

Sports medicine

From the point of view of sports medicine, asanas function as active stretches, helping to protect muscles from injury; these need to be performed equally on both sides, the stronger side first if used for physical rehabilitation.

Research

Methodology

Much of the research on the therapeutic use of yoga has been in the form of preliminary studies or clinical trials of low methodological quality, including small sample sizes, inadequate control and blinding, lack of randomization, and high risk of bias. Further research is needed to quantify the benefits and to clarify the mechanisms involved.

For example, a 2010 literature review on the use of yoga for depression stated, "although the results from these trials are encouraging, they should be viewed as very preliminary because the trials, as a group, suffered from substantial methodological limitations." A 2015 systematic review on the effect of yoga on mood and the brain recommended that future clinical trials should apply more methodological rigour.

Mechanisms

The practice of asanas has been claimed to improve flexibility, strength, and balance; to alleviate stress and anxiety, and to reduce the symptoms of lower back pain, without necessarily demonstrating the precise mechanisms involved. A review of five studies noted that three psychological (positive affect, mindfulness, self-compassion) and four biological mechanisms (posterior hypothalamus, interleukin-6, C-reactive protein and cortisol) that might act on stress had been examined empirically, whereas many other potential mechanisms remained to be studied; four of the mechanisms (positive affect, self-compassion, inhibition of the posterior hypothalamus and salivary cortisol) were found to mediate yoga's effect on stress.

Low back pain

Back pain is one reason people take up yoga, and since at least the 1960s some practitioners have claimed that it relieved their symptoms.

A 2013 systematic review on the use of yoga for low back pain found strong evidence for short- and long-term effects on pain, and moderate evidence for long-term benefit in back-specific disability, with no serious adverse events. Ten randomised controlled trials were analysed, of which eight had a low risk of bias. The outcomes measured included improvements in "pain, back-specific disability, generic disability, health-related quality of life, and global improvement". The review stated that yoga can be recommended as an additional therapy to chronic low back pain patients. A 2022 Cochrane systematic review of yoga for chronic non-specific low back pain included 21 randomised controlled trials and found that yoga produced clinically unimportant improvements in pain and back-specific function; improvements in back-specific function were similar to those obtained from other forms of therapeutic exercise, such as physical therapy.

Mental disorders

Trauma-sensitive yoga has been developed by David Emerson and others of the Trauma Center at the Justice Resource Institute in Brookline, Massachusetts. The center uses yoga alongside other treatments to support recovery from traumatic episodes and to enable healing from post-traumatic stress disorder (PTSD). Workers including Bessel van der Kolk and Richard Miller have studied how clients can "regain comfort in their bodies, counteract rumination, and improve self-regulation through yoga."

Systematic reviews indicate that yoga offers moderate benefit in the treatment of PTSD. A 2017 systematic review of PTSD in post-9/11 veterans showed that participants in studies who had received mindfulness training, mind-body therapy, and yoga "reported significant improvements in PTSD symptoms". Another systematic review on veterans the same year also found improvement in PTSD symptoms. Other systematic reviews postulate that designing the style and instructions to the needs of the veterans leads to better results and a larger impact on PTSD symptoms.

A 2013 systematic review on the use of yoga for depression found moderate evidence of short-term benefit over "usual care" and limited evidence compared to relaxation and aerobic exercise. Only 3 of 12 randomised controlled trials had a low risk of bias. The diversity of the studies precluded analysis of long-term effects. A 2015 systematic review on the effect of yoga on mood and the brain concluded that "yoga is associated with better regulation of the sympathetic nervous system and hypothalamic-pituitary-adrenal system, as well as a decrease in depressive and anxious symptoms in a range of populations." A systematic review in 2017 found some evidence of benefit in major depressive disorder, examining outcomes primarily of improvements in remission rates and severity of depression (and secondarily of anxiety and adverse events), but considered that better randomised controlled trials were required.

Cardiovascular health

A 2012 survey of yoga in Australia notes that there is "good evidence" that yoga and its associated healthy lifestyle—often vegetarian, usually non-smoking, preferring organic food, drinking less or no alcohol–are beneficial for cardiovascular health, but that there was "little apparent uptake of yoga to address [existing] cardiovascular conditions and risk factors". Yoga was cited by respondents as a cause of these lifestyle changes; the survey notes that the relative importance of the various factors had not been assessed.

Other conditions

There is little reliable evidence that yoga is beneficial for specific medical conditions, and an increasing amount of evidence that it is not, as follows.

Safety

Although relatively safe, yoga is not a risk-free form of exercise. Sensible precautions can usefully be taken – for example the avoidance of advanced moves by beginners, not combining practice with psychoactive drug use, and avoiding competitiveness.

A small percentage of yoga practitioners each year suffer physical injuries analogous to sports injuries. The practice of yoga has been cited as a cause of hyperextension or rotation of the neck, which may be a precipitating factor in cervical artery dissection.

See also 

 Exercise is Medicine
 Neurobiological effects of physical exercise
 Yoga foot drop

References

Sources

External links
 International Association of Yoga Therapists
 Vox: I read more than 50 scientific studies about yoga. Here's what I learned by Julia Belluz

Alternative medicine
Energy therapies
Yoga styles